Elena Kaliská (born 19 January 1972) is a retired Slovak slalom canoeist who competed at the international level from 1988 to 2019. Competing in four Summer Olympics, she won two gold medals in the K1 event, earning them in 2004 and 2008.

Kaliská also won five medals at the ICF Canoe Slalom World Championships with two golds (K1: 2005, K1 team: 2011), two silvers (K1: 2007, K1 team: 2009) and a bronze (K1 team: 2014).

She has won the overall World Cup title 6 times (2000-2001, 2003–2006), which is a record among women.

At the European Championships she won a total of 16 medals (8 golds, 4 silvers and 4 bronzes).

In 2021, she won a gold medal in K1 at inaugural ICF Masters Canoe Slalom World Championship in Kraków.

She announced her retirement from the sport during the 2021 World Championships in Bratislava, where she performed demo runs. Kaliská began competing in canoe slalom as soon as 1979.

World Cup individual podiums

1 World Championship counting for World Cup points
2 European Championship counting for World Cup points
3 Oceania Championship counting for World Cup points

References

12 September 2009 results of the women's K1 team finals at the 2009 ICF Canoe Slalom World Championships. - accessed 12 September 2009.

External links
 
 
 
 
 

1972 births
Canoeists at the 1996 Summer Olympics
Canoeists at the 2000 Summer Olympics
Canoeists at the 2004 Summer Olympics
Canoeists at the 2008 Summer Olympics
Living people
Olympic canoeists of Slovakia
Olympic gold medalists for Slovakia
Slovak female canoeists
Sportspeople from Zvolen
Olympic medalists in canoeing
Medalists at the 2008 Summer Olympics
Medalists at the 2004 Summer Olympics
Medalists at the ICF Canoe Slalom World Championships